The Long Pursuit is a 1967 novel written by the Australian author Jon Cleary about the escape of a group of survivors from the Battle of Singapore in the Second World War.

Proposed film version
Film rights were sold. 

Cleary adapted the novel into a script for the director Mark Robson before publication. The film was going to be called Escape Route and Robson hoped to star Paul Newman, but no movie was made.

Cleary started writing the story as a novel in London. He says he was 80-90 pages into it when contacted by Mark Robson, who was looking for a World War Two adventure. Robson read the pages and enjoyed the story. He wanted to buy the rights but asked for Cleary to do the script first. He worked on the script during 1966 and in August of that year said the film was likely to be made in the Philippines or Jamica.

In November 1966 Cleary was then turning the script into a novel. He said "I  am   actually   filling   out   the   bones  of   a   scenario   and   I   find   it   harder   to  write   than   any   other   book   I’ve   done. It   is   like   working   backwards." Cleary said he based the story on research and his own experiences fighting in Syria. I’m   as   confused   as   hell,   like   everyone  else.

References

External links
The Long Pursuit at AustLit (subscription required)

1967 Australian novels
Novels set during World War II
Novels set in Singapore
Fiction set in 1942
William Collins, Sons books
William Morrow and Company books
Novels by Jon Cleary